Voivodeship Road 112 (abbreviated DW 112) is a route in the Polish voivodeship roads network. The route links Stepnica with Voivodeship Road 113 in Modrzewie.

Important settlements along the route

Stepnica
Kąty
Krępsko
Modrzewie

Route plan

References

112